Ediz Hun (born 20 November 1940) is a Turkish film actor and politician.

Biography
Hun was born in 1940 to a Circassian father and a Turkish mother.

After studying at the St. George's Austrian High School in Istanbul, he graduated in Biology and Environmental Science from the University of Trondheim in Norway. After he had participated in a contest organized by Ses (The Voice) magazine he was noticed by producers. He made his debut in 1963 with "Genç Kızlar"  (Young Girls) opposite Hülya Koçyiğit. Ediz Hun and Filiz Akın are famous partners. He went on to become a household name, sometimes acting in more than 10 films in a year.

On 3 March 1973, he married socialite Berna after a highly publicized affair. The couple has two children, a daughter, Bengü (born 1974) and a son, Burak (born 1981). In 1985, he became a lecturer at Marmara University. He decided to try his hand at politics and became a member of parliament for the Anavatan Partisi (Motherland Party), between the years 1999 and 2002.

Filmography 

 Savaşçı, 2021 (Gündüz Göktürk)
 Arif V 216, 2018 (himself)
 Hayat Yolunda, 2014-2015
 Anadolu Kartalları, 2011
 Asla Unutma, 2005
 Azize, 2005
 Paydos, 2004
 Yadigar, 2004
 Şöhret Sandalı, 2001
 Unutmadım, 1997
 İlk Aşk, 1997
 Gökkuşağı, 1995
 Acımak, 1985
 Aman Karım Duymasın, 1976
 Garip Kuş, 1974
 Yüz Lira ile Evlenilmez, 1974
 Gariban, 1974
 Ağlıyorum, 1973
 Aşkımla Oynama, 1973
 Şüphe, 1973
 Güllü Geliyor Güllü, 1973
 Karateci Kız, 1973
 Soyguncular, 1973
 Gülüzar, 1972
 Zehra, 1972
 Çile, 1972
 Tanrı Misafiri, 1972
 Sezercik Aslan Parçası, 1972
 Asi Kalpler, 1972
 Ayrılık, 1972
 Yumurcağın Tatlı Rüyaları, 1971
 Yarın Ağlayacağım, 1971
 Ayşecik Bahar Çiçeği, 1971
 Hayatım Senindir, 1971
 Güllü, 1971
 Mavi Eşarp, 1971
 Gönül Hırsızı, 1971
 Bütün Anneler Melektir, 1971
 Seni Sevmek Kaderim, 1971
 Fadime Cambazhane Gülü, 1971
 Yağmur, 1971
 Bir Genç Kızın Romanı, 1971
 Tatlı Meleğim, 1970
 Kezban Roma'da, 1970
 Ankara Ekspresi, 1970
 Kalbimin Efendisi, 1970
 Kader Bağlayınca, 1970
 Yaban Gülü, 1970
 Söz Müdafanın, 1970
 Yuvasız Kuşlar, 1970
 Ateşli Çingene, 1969
 Sonbahar Rüzgarları, 1969
 Uykusuz Geceler, 1969
 Yaralı Kalp, 1969
 Gülnaz Sultan, 1969
 Kahraman Delikanlı, 1969
 Kanlı Aşk, 1969
 Öldüren Aşk, 1969
 Ölmüş Bir Kadının Mektupları, 1969
 Son Mektup, 1969
 Sen Bir Meleksin, 1969
 Ömrümün Tek Gecesi, 1968
 Hicran Gecesi, 1968
 Aşkım Günahımdır, 1968
 Gönüllü Kahramanlar,1968
 Sabah Yıldızı, 1968 
 Ana Hakkı Ödenmez, 1968
 Kadın Asla Unutmaz, 1968
 Gözyaşlarım, 1968
 Yuvana Dön Baba, 1968
 Gül ve Şeker, 1968
 Samanyolu, 1967
 Ayrılsak da Beraberiz, 1967
 Kelepçeli Melek, 1967
 Sinekli Bakkal, 1967
 Bir Soförun Gizli Defteri, 1967
 Yaprak Dökümü, 1967
 Kaderim Ağlamak Mı, 1967
 Nemli Dudaklar, 1967
 Sevda, 1967
 İlk Aşkım, 1967
 Yarın Çok Geç Olacak, 1967
 Sözde Kızlar, 1967
 Ömrümce Ağladım, 1967
 Beş Fındıkçı Gelin, 1966
 Çamaşırcı Güzeli, 1966
 Eli Maşalı, 1966
 Erkek Severse, 1966
 Affet Sevgilim, 1966
 Allahaısmarladık, 1966
 Severek Döğüşenler, 1966
 İhtiras Kurbanları, 1966
 Bar Kızı, 1966
 Kucaktan Kucağa, 1966
 Altın Küpeler, 1966
 Elveda Sevgilim, 1965
 Sevgili Öğretmenim, 1965
 Son Kuşlar, 1965
 Üç Kardeşe Bir Gelin, 1965
 Vahşi Gelin, 1965
 Seven Kadın Unutmaz, 1965
 Bir Gönül Oyunu, 1965
 Tehlikeli Adımlar, 1965
 Hıçkırık, 1965
 Beş Şeker Kız, 1964
 Gençlik Rüzgarı, 1964
 Öksüz Kız, 1964
 Bir İçim Su, 1964
 Ahtapotun Kolları, 1964
 Affetmeyen Kadın, 1964
 Gecelerin Kadını, 1964
 Mualla, 1964
 Genç Kızlar, 1963

References

External links
 
 Who is who database - Biography of Ediz Hun 

1940 births
Living people
Male actors from Istanbul
Turkish male film actors
Turkish people of Circassian descent
Golden Orange Life Achievement Award winners
Motherland Party (Turkey) politicians
Turkish actor-politicians
Politicians from Istanbul
Deputies of Istanbul
St. George's Austrian High School alumni
Academic staff of Marmara University
Members of the Grand National Assembly of Turkey
Norwegian University of Science and Technology alumni
Members of the 21st Parliament of Turkey